Karl Hans Albrecht Jr. (born 1948 in Essen) is a German billionaire, and the son of Karl Albrecht, who founded the discount supermarket chain Aldi with his brother Theo.

Albrecht worked for Aldi Süd in various roles until his resignation due to a cancer diagnosis (from which he subsequently recovered).  He and his sister Beate Heister control the family trust, the Siepmann Stiftung (named for their mother), which, in turn, controls Aldi Süd, the source of their joint fortune.

According to Bloomberg Billionaires Index, he has an estimated net worth of US$14.3 billion, making him the 149th wealthiest person in the world, as of June 2021.

He is married to Gabriele Mertes, and they have no children.

References

1948 births
German billionaires
20th-century German businesspeople
German businesspeople in retailing
Businesspeople from Essen
Living people